Skottorp Castle is situated in the province of Halland, southern Sweden.

Castles in Halland County